Ljubiša Dmitrović (born 23 February 1969) is a Serbian football manager and former player.

Managerial career
Dmitrović served three terms as manager of Borac Čačak (2008–2009, 2011 and 2016). He was also manager of Mladost Lučani on two occasions (2009 and 2012–2013) and Sloboda Užice (2014). In 2015, Dmitrović spent some time in charge of Montenegrin club Jedinstvo Bijelo Polje.

References

External links
 
 

Association football defenders
Expatriate football managers in Montenegro
FK Borac Čačak managers
FK Borac Čačak players
FK Mladost Lučani managers
FK Sloboda Užice managers
Serbian expatriate football managers
Serbian expatriate sportspeople in Montenegro
Serbian football managers
Serbian footballers
Serbian SuperLiga managers
Sportspeople from Čačak
Yugoslav footballers
Yugoslav Second League players
1969 births
Living people